Collinwood is the name of several places:
Collinwood, a neighborhood of Cleveland, Ohio
Welcome to Collinwood, a movie set in the Ohio neighborhood
Collinwood, Tennessee
Collinwood Township, Minnesota
Collinwood Mansion, a fictional house in the television series Dark Shadows